Ange-Laurent de La Live de Jully (2 October 1725 – 18 March 1779) was an 18th-century French financier and patron of arts.

On 30 June 1741, he married Louise-Elisabeth Chambon, reputed to be more than promiscuous. Madame d'Épinay tells us she pushed the absence of prejudice to the limit where it takes another name. But even though, she had a son, June 7, 1750. She died in December 1752, struck down by smallpox.

We know he led political missions in Geneva.

On 1 August 1762, he married his second wife, miss Nettine Walckiers, daughter of a Dutch banker and thus became Jean-Joseph de Laborde's brother-in-law, owner of the château de Méréville.

Honours 
 27 April 1754 : Free Associate of the Académie de peinture
 20 January 1756 : 
 Chevalier, baron du Châtelet, marquis de Rémoville, seigneur du franc-alleu noble de Saint-Romain

External links 
 Ange Laurent de La Live de Jully
 Genealogy

1725 births
Businesspeople from Paris
1775 deaths
French financiers